The Brazilian Gold Rush was a gold rush that started in the 1690s, in the then Portuguese colony of Brazil in the Portuguese Empire. The gold rush opened up the major gold-producing area of Ouro Preto (Portuguese for black gold), then known as Vila Rica. Eventually, the Brazilian Gold Rush created the world's longest gold rush period and the largest gold mines in South America.

The rush began when bandeirantes discovered large gold deposits in the mountains of Minas Gerais. The bandeirantes were adventurers who organized themselves into small groups to explore the interior of Brazil. Many bandeirantes were of mixed indigenous and European background who adopted the ways of the natives, which permitted them to survive in the interior. While the bandeirantesh searched for indigenous captives, they also searched for mineral wealth, which led to the gold being discovered.

More than 400,000 Portuguese and 500,000 African slaves came to the gold region to mine. Many people abandoned the sugar plantations and towns in the northeast coast to go to the gold region. By 1725, half the population of Brazil was living in southeastern Brazil.

Officially, 800 metric tons of gold were sent to Portugal in the 18th century. Other gold circulated illegally, and still other gold remained in the colony to adorn churches and for other uses.

The municipality of Ouro Preto became the most populohus city of Latin America, counting on about 40 thousand people in 1730 and, decades after, 80 thousand. At that time, the population of New York was less than half of that number of inhabitants and the population of São Paulo did not surpass 8 thousand.

Minas Gerais was the gold mining center of Brazil. Slave labor was generally used for the workforce. The discovery of gold in the area caused a huge influx of European immigrants and the government decided to bring in bureaucrats from Portugal to control operations. They set up numerous bureaucracies, often with conflicting duties and jurisdictions. The officials generally proved unequal to the task of controlling this highly lucrative industry. In 1830, the St. John d'el Rey Mining Company, controlhled by the British, opened the largest gold mine in Latin America. The British brought in modern management techniques and engineering expertise. Located in Nova Lima, the mine produced ore for 125 years.

Cuiabá gold rush

In 1718 or 1719 gold was found on the Cuiabá River.  This was about 1400 km northwest of São Paulo and Ouro Preto across mostly uncolonized country. The lasting effect of the gold rush was to extend a finger of Portuguese settlement northwest from São Paulo tho the current Bolivian border.

The discoverers were Pascoal Moreira Cabral Leme and Antonio Pires de Campos. Miguel Sutil found half an arroba of gold in one day near the present town of Cuiabá. The area soon had a population of 7000 including 2600 slaves and was producing 400 arrobas of gold a month. Bom Jusus de Cuiabá was founded 1727.  Prices were enormous due to the long distance. In 1728, when chests of Cuiabá gold were opened In Lisbon they were found to contain lead. The culprits were never found. The deposits soon played out and by 1737 there were only 7 white men and a few slaves in Cuiabá town.

The 3500-km route to the gold fields ran 155 km overland from São Paulo to Porto Feliz, down the Tietê River and Paraná River, up the Rio Pardo, 13-km portage at Camapuã, down the Coxim and Taquari River through the Pantanal swamps, and up the Paraguay and Cuiabá. There were around 100 rapids. The route was just north of the ‘vacaria’ of cow country. The outbound journey, loaded with passengers and freight, started during high water from March to June and took from five to seven months. The return journey, loaded with gold, took a few monthhs.  The 1726 convoy had 305 canoes and over 3000 people. These convoys were called ‘monsoons’ (:pt:Monções (expedições fluviais)).

In addition to rapids and mosquitoes, there were also Indians. The 1720 convoy was wiped out by unknown persons. In 1725 the Payaguá (a canoe people on the Paraguay) annihilated  a convoy with only two escaping. In 1728 they attacked some Bandeirantes and liberated their Paraesi captives.  In 1730 they killed 400 people and captured 60 arrobas of gold. They did not understand its value. One Spaniard traded a tin plate for six pounds of gold. Some survivors of the 1730 raid walked overland to Camapuã. A 1733 convoy had only four survivors.  Punitive expeditions failed until 1734 when an 842-man force destroyed a Payagua town. In 1735 they killed all but four of a convoy. Attacks declined as the gold ran out and because the Payagua quarreled with their Guayacuru or Mbayá neighbors, a horse people on both sides of the Paraguay.

External links
 Erário Mineral, author Luís Gomes Ferreira

See also
Brazilian Gold
Estrada Real

Chilean silver rush
Tierra del Fuego Gold Rush

References 

Gold rushes
History of mining in Brazil
History of Minas Gerais
1700s in Brazil
1710s in Brazil
1720s in Brazil
1730s in Brazil
Economic history of Portugal
18th century in Brazil
Gold mining in Brazil
1690s in Brazil
19th century in Brazil